Sevenhampton may refer to:
Sevenhampton, Gloucestershire, England
Sevenhampton, Wiltshire, England